Jules Louis Guillery (14 March 1824 – 7 February 1902) was a Belgian lawyer and liberal politician.

As a politician, he was a member of the Belgian parliament and President of the Belgian Chamber of Representatives from 13 November 1878 until 10 March 1881 and Minister of State.

See also
 Liberal Party
 Liberalism in Belgium

Sources
 Jules Louis Guillery
 Lebrocquy, G., Types et Profils parlementaires, Paris, Lachaud & Burdin, 1873, p. 191-192.
 Annales de la Société Archéologique de l'arrondissement de Nivelles, T. X, Nivelles, 1911, p. 258.
 De Paepe, Jean-Luc, Raindorf-Gérard, Christiane (ed.), Le Parlement Belge 1831-1894. Données Biographiques, Brussels, Académie Royale de Belgique, 1996, p. 332.
 Serwy, V., La coopération en Belgique. Dictionnaire biographique, Brussels, 1952, p. 166.

1802 births
1878 deaths
Belgian Ministers of State
Presidents of the Chamber of Representatives (Belgium)